The 1991 Greek Ice Hockey Championship season was the third season of the Greek Ice Hockey Championship. The Aris Saloniki Penguins were league champions for the third year in a row.

External links
List of champions on icehockey.gr

Greek Ice Hockey Championship seasons
Greek
Ice